James Henry Carroll (c. 1876 – October 17, 1950) was a member of the Wisconsin State Senate twice. First, from 1925 to 1931, and second, from 1941 to 1943.

Carroll was primarily engaged in the real estate and insurance businesses, also having worked as a teacher and a banker. In 1938, he was a candidate for the United States House of Representatives from Wisconsin's 10th congressional district. He lost to incumbent Bernard J. Gehrmann. Carroll was a Republican.

Carroll died at the age of 74, due to a heart ailment.

References

Republican Party Wisconsin state senators
1870s births
1950 deaths